Originally the brainchild of Keith Feinstein, Videotopia is a travelling science museum exhibition documenting the history of video games.  It is based on a larger collection of video game machines, now housed at The Strong in Rochester, New York.

Collection
It includes a wide range of commercial video arcade machines and game consoles, and also interactive multimedia kiosks containing information about the history of the games' development and their impact on popular culture. By 1996, the exhibit had had 20,000 attendees. In 1998, Feinstein's collection included 300 machines, and the touring exhibit had 75 of them. By 2009 the touring exhibition included 100 machines, and the collection amounted to 15,000 items relating to video games.

Videotopia was operated by Feinstein's longtime curatorial partner Jeff Anderson, who maintained the exhibit's vast game collection, based in New Jersey.  Later Jon-Paul Dyson took over and the collection moved to the International Center for the History of Electronic Games at The Strong in Rochester, New York.

Videotopia has been featured at numerous science museums in the U.S., such as the Franklin Institute in Philadelphia, as well as overseas and in selected performances of Video Games Live.  Videotopia has been featured on television on CBS: This Morning, the History Channel, CNN, CNBC, and many local television news programs and written about in Forbes magazine, USA Today, Technology Review, TICKET, and Next Generation.

References

External links
 
 

Traveling exhibits
History of science and technology in the United States
Video game exhibitions